Noordolal or Noor Dolal is one of the oldest villages of Gujar Khan Tehsil, of the Rawalpindi District, Punjab, Pakistan. It was once a main shopping and activity centre of the local area having grocery shops, crockery shops, goldsmith shops, a Jama Masjid (congregational mosque), one each boys and girls schools, and a post office.

Noordolal is the main village with minor villages in its territory including Bunmera (Dhoke Major with the name of Major M.Anwer Qureshi of Bunmera), Dhoke Aarra, Dhoke Gumti, Dhoke Gurrah, Dhoke Mir Afzal Shaheed, and Dhoke Lamiam.

There is a girls' Middle school in Dhoke Qureshian (Dhoke Lamian),and also a boys Middle school in Noor Dolal (The land was donated by Maj.M Anwar Qureshi)  .The Basic Health Unit for the Union Council Noor Dolal is also located in this village at Ghousia Chowk (jor). Ghousia Chowk is also the main shopping centre of Noordolal.

Populated places in Rawalpindi District